"Lachin y Gair", often known as "Dark Lochnagar" or "Loch na Garr", is a poem by Lord Byron, written in 1807. It discusses the author's childhood in north east Scotland, when he used to visit Lochnagar in Highland Aberdeenshire. It is perhaps one of the poet's most Scottish works, both in theme and sentiment.

Textual analysis

Lachin y Gair is essentially about childhood, ancestry (dualchas), and sense of place (duthchas) presented as Sehnsucht.

Byron begins with contrasting the gentrified landscapes of southern England, with the harsher, colder East Highlands:

Then in the second stanza Byron refers to how his "young footsteps in infancy, wander'd" around the area, and how he would hear the "traditional story,/Disclos'd by the natives of dark Loch na Garr."

In the third and fourth stanzas, Byron mentions his Jacobite ancestors who haunt the area and who were "Ill starr'd, though brave, did no visions foreboding/Tell you that fate had forsaken your cause?/Ah! were you destined to die at Culloden" Byron himself says

In the fifth stanza, Byron laments his exile from Scotland:

Folk song
The work has been set to a tune attributed to Sir Henry Bishop, and remains a popular standard in Scottish folk music. A number of versions exist, but it was notably recorded by The Corries. Jimmy McDermid, father of Val McDermid also used to sing the song.

The Fiddler's Companion claims that the tune also travelled to Ireland:

As the Penguin Book of Scottish Verse says:

Beethoven set the poem as "Lochnagar" (No. 9 in his 12 Scottish Folksongs WoO 156, published 1814–15) to a purportedly Scottish folk melody, but the tune was actually written by an Englishman called Maurice Greene (1696-1755), a composer of the late Baroque period.

Lochnagar elsewhere in Byron
Byron also referred to Lochnagar in The Island:

See also
 Early life of George Gordon Byron

References

External links 

 Dark Lochnagar on the Scots Independent
 Lochnagar at the Scottish Poetry Library
 Byron on Undiscovered Scotland

Poetry by Lord Byron
1807 poems
Scottish poems